The Malawi spinyeel (Mastacembelus shiranus) is a species of fish in the family Mastacembelidae from Africa. It is endemic to the Lake Malawi basin, including the main lake itself, Lake Malombe and the lower Shire River. It is the only described species of spinyeel in Lake Malawi, but a brightly marked variant, Mastacembelus sp. "Rosette" is also known. It is unclear if it is a variant of the Malawi spinyeel or an undescribed species.

References

Malawi spinyeel
Fish of Lake Malawi
Taxonomy articles created by Polbot
Malawi spinyeel
Malawi spinyeel